The history of Breton nationalism, as an organised set of political and cultural movements, started during the latter half of the 19th century.

The name Breton movement, or Emsav in Breton (pronounced , meaning 'uplifting, renovation'), is used to group the major Breton political and cultural movements. Some feel the term (or the movements themselves) does not adequately reflect the diversity, internal divisions and conflicts within Brittany.

Traditionally, the history of the Breton movement is split into three periods: the First Emsav being the birth of the Breton movement before 1914; the Second Emsav covering the period 1914–1945; and Third Emsav for the postwar movements. The historic memory of the Second Emsav has been tarnished in the memory of many by the collaboration of some leading Breton nationalists during the German occupation of France. After the war, the movement was widely discredited politically and several of these members arrested as collaborators. The second Emsav essentially disappeared. After the Second Emsav went into limbo, Breton nationalism remained practically silent for two decades.

The Third Emsav was closely associated with the upsurge of social contestation during the 1960s. It movement grew without links with the previous nationalist movements and, in sharp contrast with the earlier ideology, occupied the left side of the political spectrum, with affinity ranging from social-democrat liberalism to Marxism revolutionary. That can help to explain the reluctance that some members of the movement feel toward the term "nationalism", which, in France, has right-wing connotations. The movement has experienced continued momentum by the growth of regional identities across Europe in the 1980s and to the present. Now, Bretons live normal lives around the world.

Recently, a new branch of the movement, Adsav , a far-right organisation, has appeared. It, however, is still very small and has no connection with the third Emsav.

See also
Breton nationalism
Breton nationalism and World War II

External links
L’interceltisme contemporain

Breton nationalism